Pierre Roux-Dorlut (October 10, 1919-19 February 1995) was a French architect and urbanist, associated with Daniel Badani.

Fifty years of common work

Roux-Dorlut was born in Puy-en-Velay. In 1946 he formed with Badani a partnership to study the rebuilding of the Languedoc, and that partnership, based on a common architectural training and reinforced by a common regional background, was cemented by more than fifty years of work, struggle and friendship.
A "partnership" suggests reciprocal influence, complementary enrichment, a dialogue in which the naturel inclination of each partner is tempered by that of the other. However, for those who know Roux-Dorlut well, it is possible to discern the impact of the individual personality on their joint achievements. They carry out their professional programs together, but the final embodiment in form often reveals the dominant influence of one or the other.
Daniel Badani shows a certain classicism, even a taste for the baroque, tendencies curbed by Roux-Dorlut who, five years younger and of an austere and determined character, tends to simplify by finding everywhere a contemporary expression in architecture.
Their first achievements were in Africa, notably in Abidjan where they built, among other works, the courtrooms for the Palace of Justice, the Central Posts and Telecommunications Building, and various residential districts; in Dakar, where they built the Palais du Grand Conseil, which became the National Assembly of Senegal; and in Bouake, where they built the general hospital. In France they produced the plans and numerous buildings for the Centre for Nuclear Studies at Marcoul and at Cadarache, competition projects like the Vincennes Stadium, residential complexes both in the South and in the Paris area, and educational, industrial, public, and administrative buildings throughout the country.
In all these projects, Roux-Dorlut expresses a preference for very careful organization of volumes, spaces, and open green areas in relation to their surroundings.
One of their most recent projects is St Louis Hospital, where he introduced new forms and volumes around a seventeenth-century historical monument with great sensitivity and respect. In the University of Nancy, the same care for composition within an urban setting, the extremely well considered relationship between different buildings, and the choice of materials, show a remarkable sensitivity and elegance, as well as his tendency to research new forms for each project.

With his wife

He is especially interested in large-scale designs, amongst which the project for the new Royal Hippone City and the University of Constantine in Algeria, also major undertakings such as the Cézeaux Science Park at Clermont Ferrand, the regional head offices of Crédit Agricole bank at Montpellier, the National Polytechnic Institute at Nancy and the Urban Development building complex in the Sèvres bridge quarter at Boulogne-sur-Seine
For the last two years Pierre Roux-Dorlut has worked in partnership with his wife Christine Roux-Dorlut, an architect who has gained wide experience in her own career. 
Christine Roux-Dorlut graduated from the Warsaw Polytechnic, then the Ecole Spéciale d’Architecture in Paris and the Institute of Urban Planning at the Sorbonne. She devoted a thesis to the Nancy architect Emmanuel HERE, worked under Le Corbusier’s direction for the development of Venise, collaborated with Bodiansky and Candilis at the Atelier des Bâtisseurs set up by Le Corbusier.  She is a member of the Academy of Architecture, President of the Anglo-French Union of Architects, Professor at the Schools of American Arts at Fontainbleau. She received the Beauty Award from the City of Paris, member of CIAM, officier of the Legion of Honour.
Christine Roux-Dorlut has designed numerous collective and one-family housing projects, mainly with the Caisse de Dépôts and Consignations. Other achievements include: the Maure Vieil urban plan (Alpes Maritimes), study of an arts and crafts village, head office of Amalgamated Dental at Rueil Malmaison, housing and service premises in Paris and the Ile de France.
She participated in the urban development  plan for Alger (Annassaires new town). Recently she supervised the rehabilitation of the Bel Air Château and estate at Deauville and designed the Gershwin building in Boulogne-sur-Seine.
In partnership with Pierre Roux-Dorlut she developed a project for a theme park in a large leisure area, Orlando, Florida. Together they worked on an extensive project at Vence, the home of Matisse, the Artists' City, a centre of contemporary art in the Esterel, a block of one-family housing at Boulogne-sur-Seine, the rehabilitation of a 17th-century château at Montfort l'Amaury.

External links
Pierre Roux-Dorlut at archiwebture

People from Le Puy-en-Velay
1919 births
1995 deaths
20th-century French architects